Emblem3 is an American rap rock band from Sequim, Washington, consisting of Wesley Stromberg (born December 6, 1993), Drew Chadwick (born October 1, 1992), and Keaton Stromberg (born July 16, 1996). In 2013, they signed with Simon Cowell's record label Syco Records and Columbia Records after finishing fourth on the second season of The X Factor. Their first single, "Chloe (You're the One I Want)", was released on April 15, 2013, and their debut album, entitled Nothing to Lose, was released on July 30, 2013.

Outside of Emblem3, Wesley Stromberg and Drew Chadwick have released music as soloists, while Keaton Stromberg is the frontman of the band The Social.

Career

Formation
While attending middle school in Sequim, Washington, Drew Chadwick and Wesley Stromberg began doing sessions together as American Scholars. At the time, Keaton Stromberg  was only nine and was in his own band called Lucky 13 (guitar Keaton, bass Eli Fozio, drums Sara Mobley). While Wesley had moved to Huntington Beach, California with his girlfriend, Chadwick spent high school moving up and down the West Coast, eventually joining Wesley in Huntington Beach. Keaton enrolled in a nearby art school and moved to California to join them. They released an album, Bite Your Lip and Take It under the name The American Scholars, which they produced in their basement. After going through many names, the trio settled on "Emblem3" while in Huntington Beach. They performed locally along the Sunset Strip.

2012: The X Factor
In 2012, Emblem3 auditioned in San Francisco for the second season of The X Factor, singing an original song called "Sunset Blvd", written by Chadwick. During bootcamp, they sang "Iris" by the Goo Goo Dolls and at judges' houses, they performed "Every Little Thing She Does Is Magic" by The Police. They were then selected to go on to live shows.

Emblem3 performed "One Day" by Matisyahu during their first live show on October 31. In addition they were selected as the first group to enter the top twelve by Simon Cowell. On the second live show on November 7, the group performed their version of "My Girl" by the Temptations and "California Gurls" by Katy Perry with "What Makes You Beautiful" by One Direction as the background track. After the second live show the group was ranked sixth based on the fan votes and made it to the next week's live shows. On the third live show, they performed "No One" by Alicia Keys and were ranked fourth by the fan votes moving on to week five. On the fourth live show on November 21, 2012, they performed "Secrets" by OneRepublic and were ranked again 4th by the American public. For the fifth live show, they performed "I'm a Believer" by The Monkees and were ranked third. On the sixth live show, the group performed two songs: the first one, chosen by their mentor, was "Just the Way You Are" by Bruno Mars; the second song, chosen by the fans in the Pepsi Challenge, was "Forever Young" by Alphaville. The group was once again ranked third overall by the fans' votes. In the semi-finals, they performed "Baby, I Love Your Way" by Peter Frampton as their own choice and "Hey Jude" by The Beatles as Cowell's choice. They were eliminated on the result show and placed fourth overall.

Performances on The X Factor

2013–2014: Nothing to Lose
The trio began to record their debut album, Nothing to Lose, in December 2012. It was released on July 30, 2013. The lead single, "Chloe (You're the One I Want)", peaked at number 93 on the Billboard Hot 100. The second single off the album was "3000 Miles". The band toured to promote their music in their "Goin' Back to Cali Tour" that took place in April 2013. Emblem3 later performed as the opening act for Selena Gomez on her Stars Dance Tour that began in August 2013. On December 5, 2013, Emblem3 had their homecoming performance on The X Factor, singing "Just for One Day". After their performance, they announced their first national headlining tour, "#Bandlife".

Emblem3 released their first EP titled Songs from the Couch, Vol. I on June 2, 2014, independently.

On June 20, 2014, the band announced that band member Drew Chadwick was leaving the band to pursue a solo career. Keaton and Wesley Stromberg released their first EP as a duo titled Forever Together on October 27, 2014.

2015–present: Waking Up, hiatus and return
The band reunited in 2016 and released the EP Waking Up, as well as a self-titled app they used to release new music on. In April of the same year, they embarked their Waking Up world tour.

After creative differences and conflicts with management, Emblem3 went on another hiatus. The band was reunited again in 2021, with the release of three singles: "Champagne Dreams", "Eyes Wide Open", and "So Proud".

Discography

Studio albums

Extended plays

Singles

As featured artist

Awards and nominations

Tours
 West Coast Tour (2013)
 E3 Goes East (2013)
 Goin' Back to Cali (2013)
 Emblem3 Summer Tour (2013)
 Stars Dance Tour (Opening Act) (2013)
 #Bandlife Tour (2014) (opening acts included MKTO and Jackson Guthy)
 Fireside Story Sessions (2014)
 Forever Together Tour (late 2014)
 Waking Up Tour (2016) (opening acts include Megan Nicole, Dyllan Murray, and The Ready Set)
The group also performed at multiple festivals throughout the year such as Z-Fest (Brazil), Kiss Concert (Boston, MA), various holiday concerts, Spring Break Portugal etc.

The group is also scheduled to perform at music festivals and concert series throughout the summer such as Ramapo Summer Concert Series (NY) etc.

The group also has done shows with many other artists such as Jack & Jack (Jack Gilinsky and Jack Johnson)

References

External links
 

2004 establishments in Washington (state)
Musical groups established in 2007
American boy bands
Columbia Records artists
Musical groups from Washington (state)
Syco Music artists
The X Factor (American TV series) contestants
Musical groups from California
People from Huntington Beach, California
Singers from Washington (state)
Musical groups disestablished in 2017